Persécution is a 2009 romantic-drama film directed by Patrice Chéreau. It stars Romain Duris, Charlotte Gainsbourg and Jean-Hugues Anglade. It premiered on 5 September 2009 at the 66th Venice International Film Festival where it was nominated for the Golden Lion.

Plot
Daniel, 35, is haunted by a stranger who regularly breaks into his house and spies on him. One day, the stranger, a seemingly harmless middle-aged man, confronts Daniel and tells him that he is the man of his life.  Daniel is shocked by the admission and tells the stranger to stay away. Daniel has a girlfriend, Sonia, whom he persecutes yet also worships. Sonia prioritizes her career before her relationship with Daniel and ignores his needs.

Cast
Romain Duris as Daniel
Charlotte Gainsbourg as Sonia
Jean-Hugues Anglade as The madman
Gilles Cohen as Michel
Hiam Abbass as Marie
Alex Descas as Thomas
Tsilla Chelton as Old woman
Corinne Masiero

Reception
Ray Bennett of The Hollywood Reporter wrote, "Charismatic stars and the film's Gallic shrug of acceptance over the difficulties that being in love creates will take the film to festivals and art houses, but it's far from a classic".

Award and nominations

Venice Film Festival
Golden Lion - Patrice Chéreau 

César Awards
César Award for Best Supporting Actor - Jean-Hugues Anglade

References

External links

German romantic drama films
French romantic drama films
French LGBT-related films
2009 romantic drama films
LGBT-related romantic drama films
2009 LGBT-related films
German LGBT-related films
2000s French films
2000s German films